Tarso Anibal Santanna Marques (born 19 January 1976) is a Brazilian racing driver. He previously participated in 24 Formula One Grands Prix, all driving for the Minardi team, but scored no championship points in three separate seasons and never completed a full year in the sport.

Racing career

Open wheel racing
After five years of karting, Marques raced in Formula Chevrolet in his home country aged only 16, and he won the title at his first attempt. In 1993 he moved up to Formula Three Sudamericana and subsequently European Formula 3000, and became the youngest driver to win races at both levels.  In ,  he started racing for Minardi in Formula One, competing with various drivers for the seat over the following two years, including Giancarlo Fisichella, Jarno Trulli and Pedro Lamy.  Minardi's financial situation demanded that drivers with strong sponsorship were generally favoured, and there were several driver changes in the team at that time.

In 1999, he moved stateside to drive in the American Champ Car ranks, and caught the eye of legendary team-owner Roger Penske.  When two-time Indianapolis 500 winner Al Unser Jr. was injured, Penske asked him to fill in.  His best finish was 9th.  In 2000, 2004, and 2005, he drove sporadically in that series for perennial minnows Dale Coyne Racing, with a best result of 11th.

He finished the season ahead of the Spaniard but it was a difficult season for Marques, with the team's financial difficulties not always allowing equal equipment for both drivers. Marques brought no money to the team and was employed under the provision that another driver with more sponsorship money could replace him at any point in the season, and that prospect was realised towards the end of the year, when Minardi replaced Marques with Alex Yoong with three races remaining. Marques welcomed the driver change as the extra finance would enable the team to progress, adding, "Yoong brought the sponsor for the team already two or three races ago so he should be in the car." His two ninth-place finishes remained Minardi's best results of the season, but he was nearly always outpaced by Alonso. Marques would however remain at Minardi for 2002 as the test and reserve driver. Despite this, he did not replace Yoong later in the season when the Malaysian was dropped, with the seat instead going to Anthony Davidson, and Justin Wilson also being offered the drive ahead of Marques.

Since his last Champ Car outing in 2005, Marques has returned to South America to drive in the TC2000 and Stock Car Brasil touring car championships.

Stock car racing
In March 2022, it was announced that Marques would compete in the NASCAR Cup Series, driving the No. 79 Ford Mustang for Team Stange Racing on a part-time basis. His Cup Series debut, which was going to be in the race at Road America, had to be delayed as NASCAR would not approve him to make a Cup Series start without any prior experience in a stock car. As a result, TSR announced that they would field an entry for Marques in the NASCAR Xfinity Series race at the Indianapolis Road Course in order for him to be approved to race in the Cup Series, and his first Cup Series start would now be in the race at Watkins Glen. The team and Marques did not show up for the race weekend. Nothing has been heard from the team since then, and they ended up not running at all in 2022.

Racing record

Complete International Formula 3000 results
(key) (Races in bold indicate pole position) (Races in italics indicate fastest lap)

Complete Formula One results
(key)

American open-wheel racing
(key)

CART/Champ Car

^ New points system implemented in 2004.

References

'Professor' de Alonso na F1, Marques vê automobilismo acabado no Brasil

External links

 
 
 Profile on F1 Rejects
 Profile - by FIA GT Championship official website

1976 births
Living people
Brazilian people of Spanish descent
Brazilian racing drivers
Brazilian Formula One drivers
Minardi Formula One drivers
Brazilian Champ Car drivers
FIA GT Championship drivers
Formula 3 Sudamericana drivers
Stock Car Brasil drivers
TC 2000 Championship drivers
International Formula 3000 drivers
Brazilian expatriates in Italy
Brazilian expatriate sportspeople in the United States
Sportspeople from Curitiba
Team Penske drivers
NASCAR drivers
Dale Coyne Racing drivers
DAMS drivers